The Parthian-class submarine or P class was a class of six submarines built for the Royal Navy in the late 1920s. They were designed as long-range patrol submarines for the Far East.

Boats

References

Bibliography

External links

Submarine classes